Rajgir Film City is an integrated film studio complex located in Nalanda, Bihar. Spread over 20 acres, it is the Second largest integrated film city in Bihar. It is built by Bihar government from 2017. Rajgir is also a popular tourism and recreation centre, containing natural and artificial attractions including an amusement park. Around 2.5 million tourists visit the place every year.

Development
Rajgir Film City now under construction from 2017.

See also
 Bhojiwood

References

External links
 Financial Express - 

Indian film studios
Nalanda district
Cinema of Bihar
Rajgir